The Mexican agouti (Dasyprocta mexicana), also known as the Mexican black agouti, is a species of rodent in the family Dasyproctidae. It is native to lowland evergreen forest and second growth in southern Mexico (Veracruz, Oaxaca, Chiapas and Tabasco), but has also been introduced to Cuba. This critically endangered species is threatened by habitat loss. Its overall blackish color separates it from the only other agouti found in Mexico, the Central American agouti.

References

Dasyprocta
Mammals of Mexico
Mammals of Cuba
Mammals of the Caribbean
Rodents of North America
Natural history of Chiapas
Natural history of Oaxaca
Natural history of Tabasco
Natural history of Veracruz
Critically endangered biota of Mexico
Critically endangered fauna of North America
Mammals described in 1860
Taxonomy articles created by Polbot